Taking Care of Business may refer to:

 "Takin' Care of Business" (song), a 1974 song by Bachman–Turner Overdrive
 Taking Care of Business (film), a 1990 comedy film
 Takin' Care of Business (album), a 1960 album by Charlie Rouse
 Taking Care of Business (Oliver Nelson album), 1960
 Takin' Care of Business, a 1998 compilation album by Bachman–Turner Overdrive
 Taking Care of Business, a 1970 album by James Cotton
 Taking Care of Business, a 1995 album by Senseless Things

See also
TCB (album), a 2010 album by James Reyne, abbreviation for Taking Care of Business
TCB (TV program), a 1968 Motown television special and its respective album, abbreviation for Taking Care of Business
TCB (disambiguation)